Ubuntu Unity is a Linux distribution based on Ubuntu,  using the Unity interface in place of Ubuntu's GNOME Shell. The first release was 20.04 LTS on 7 May 2020. Prior to the initial release it had the working names of Unubuntu and Ubuntu Unity Remix.

History
The Unity interface was originally developed by Canonical and first included as the default interface in Ubuntu 11.04, which was released in April 2011. Unity was developed as an alternative to the GNOME Shell, which replaced the GNOME 2 interface. At that time Canonical had planned to converge the desktop, cellphone and tablet interfaces into Unity 8, a project that was abandoned in 2017 when Ubuntu moved to the GNOME 3 desktop instead, ending Unity development at version 7, version 8 being incomplete. Ubuntu 17.04 introduced the GNOME 3 desktop in April 2017, but it was not universally accepted by Ubuntu users or developers. A number of forks were proposed, with UBports taking over Unity 8 development for its value as a cellphone interface and renaming it Lomiri in February 2020. In 2019 Canonical gave its approval for the use of trademarks for a Unity 7 Ubuntu remix.

Linux Foundation Certified Developer and Ubuntu team member Rudra B. Saraswat, who is based near Bangalore, India, started Ubuntu Unity. He polled users and used a stock Unity 7 interface with the Ubuntu backend and minimal changes otherwise. He included the Nemo file manager as an alternative to GNOME Files and employed the GNOME Display Manager to replace LightDM X display manager.

Saraswat had previously created several other Linux distributions, including the server-focused Krob Linux. About his motivations for starting Ubuntu Unity, Saraswat stated, "I had used Ubuntu 17.04 back when I was 8 [years old] and I really loved Unity7, so when Unity7 was discontinued by Canonical, I wasn't happy and wanted to bring it back. I created this project to give Unity7 a new life". Saraswat was ten years old in 2020 when he first released Ubuntu Unity. He indicated at the time that his goal was to eventually have the distribution accepted as an official Ubuntu "flavour".

Ubuntu Unity became a recognized flavour starting with the 22.10 release.

Releases

Ubuntu Unity 20.04 LTS

This release was the first Ubuntu Unity release, as well as the first long-term support release. It was released on 7 May 2020, two weeks after the release of Ubuntu 20.04 LTS. It uses a default Yaru theme with Papirus icons with Adwaita, Ambiance, Radiance and High Contrast themes available.

This initial release attracted the attention of the tech press and was widely reported.

In a review in Forbes, Jason Evangelho stated, "If you're yearning for the good ole' Unity and Compiz days, I bring awesome tidings: someone's shining a new spotlight on them, and the stage underneath is a brand new Linux distribution called Ubuntu Unity Remix 20.04".

Jack Wallen of TechRepublic wrote, "Unity is back as is your ticket out of a world of inefficient desktop interfaces that made using a laptop a less-than-ideal proposition. For those who've lauded Ubuntu's choice to switch to GNOME, fear not—Ubuntu is sticking with GNOME. Unity, on the other hand, has made its return, thanks to the likes of the Ubuntu Unity desktop distribution. It's a fresh take on an old, once defunct favorite".

Marius Nestor reviewed the release in 9to5Linux, stating, "I took Ubuntu Unity Remix 20.04 for a spin and it brought back good old memories for me. The spin looks great and works like a charm".

Eric Londo of Linux++ reviewed the new release, saying, "Yes, this was the old Unity I used to know and love, but somehow it felt fresher. As I worked to regain muscle memory over the key-bindings (GNOME really can take over the way you control your system XD), the experience was smooth, graceful, and fun in a way that is unique to the Unity experience. During the testing, I did not encounter a single issue that I would deem detrimental or even annoying. Everything from the Dash to the file manager and theming appeared to be just where it had left off, not skipping a beat. Congratulations to Rudra Saraswat on bringing Ubuntu Unity back to life".

Adam Hunt of Full Circle, wrote, "this release can't be termed "groundbreaking" or "a game-changer", but it does show exactly where the mainstream Ubuntu could have been today if it had not left Unity 7 behind for the Gnome Shell".

The first point release was made on 6 August 2020, on the same day as the other Ubuntu flavours and included fixes for a number of small issues.

A 19 October 2020 review by John Perkins in Make Tech Easier faulted the release for its high idle CPU and RAM use, and noted, "the main thing that sticks out as a con to me is the wallflower factor. Nothing about Unity really sticks out. Aside from the search function, the appearance, look and feel of Unity doesn't have anything special enough to keep me coming back".

Ubuntu Unity 20.10

This standard release came out on 22 October 2020.

The version incorporates Linux kernel version 5.8 and uses GNU GRUB for both BIOS and UEFI booting. It also adds fixes and updates for many user interface issue, including adding the Compiz settings manager, with many plugins and effects. It also introduces a new default theme of Arc-darker, new wallpaper and a new Yaru-Purple theme and icon theme.

In a review of the first alpha version, Marius Nestor wrote in 9to5 Linux, "I took it for a test drive, and, to my surprise, everything works a lot faster than version 20.04".

A review of the final release on Debug Point, Arandam Giri praised Ubuntu Unity's efficiency and how it improved user productivity.

A January 2021 review in Full Circle magazine noted: "Ubuntu Unity 20.10 is a very strong release. It builds on the success and all the tech press attention that the first release garnered and shows developer commitment to taking Ubuntu Unity further, with the goal of gaining official status. Adding the CompizConfig Settings Manager, more window and icon themes, and a wide array of wallpaper choices, plus settling on Thunderbird for email and Nemo as the default file manager, shows that this development cycle is going to be focused on sharpening the user experience. This makes it worth tracking this distribution along the road to the next LTS version, 22.04 LTS, due out in April 2022. If this release is any indication, we should see good things in the future".

Ubuntu Unity 21.04

Ubuntu Unity 21.04 is a standard release, made on 22 April 2021.

This version uses Linux kernel 5.11 and included a new Yaru-Unity7 theme, plus a new transparent launcher icon. It also included new wallpapers and a new Plymouth theme for boot-up, plus a few bug fixes.

Reviewer Marius Nestor noted in 9 to 5 Linux, "Ubuntu Unity 21.04 is here to give fans of the good old Unity 7 desktop environment a much-improved experience by shipping with a new Yaru-Unity7 dark theme that features a transparent launcher icon, a new Plymouth boot splash theme, as well as new wallpapers based on the Hirsute Hippo mascot. Various apps have been updated to their latest release, and other received bug fixes to work better, such as the GNOME system monitor app. In addition, this release adds the missing notifications for volume and brightness changes, and improves support for Snap apps".

A review in the August 2021 issue of Full Circle, concluded, "Ubuntu Unity 21.04 is another strong release from the development team. The focus of this development cycle has been on including more user 'look and feel' choices, while providing the efficient Unity 7 interface and a good range of applications. It is a formula that seems to be working, as each release, so far, has accumulated improvements".

Ubuntu Unity 21.10

Ubuntu Unity 21.10 is a standard release, that came out on 14 October 2021.

This release included an updated version of the Unity user interface from version 7.5.0 to 7.5.1, incorporating updated indicators and migration of the glib-2.0 schemas to the gsettings-ubuntu-schemas.

Ubuntu Unity 21.10 uses the Snap version of the Firefox web browser, in place of the previous Deb version, a move that matches Ubuntu 21.10. A new Plymouth splash screen and new artwork were introduced, including the default Indri-themed wallpaper.

The project also adopted a new simplified Ubuntu Unity logo by Muqtadir and Allan Carvalho.

This release also marked the start of migration of the project to GitLab and the design of a new website, due to expanding need and increased traffic. The developers also indicated the project was beginning a move to the lol Snap store, as an alternative to the existing Canonical Snap store at snapcraft.io.

A review in the February 2022 edition of Full Circle noted, "Ubuntu Unity 21.10 is not as strong a release as was expected and has some outstanding issues that were present at the time of its release. The lack of the Unity Tweak Tool, installed by default or even that can be installed and run, means that the themes provided cannot be properly accessed. I think it is okay to put out a "standard" release that has unsolved bugs like this, but the developers need to clearly explain the issue in the release announcement and indicate when it is expected to be fixed".

Ubuntu Unity 22.04 LTS

This fifth release of Ubuntu Unity was made on 21 April 2022 and is a long term support release, supported for three years, until April 2025.

Changes in this release include adding Flatpak and the Flathub repositories by default. Different installation files for BIOS and UEFI hardware have been merged into one .ISO file download, too.

A number of application changes were made, with MATE applications largely replacing GNOME ones. The Atril PDF viewer replaced Evince, pluma text editor replaced gedit, Eye of MATE image viewer replaced Eye of GNOME, the MATE System monitor replaced GNOME System Monitor and VLC media player replaced GNOME Videos. As well as Synaptic and GDebi were removed.

A review in Full Circle magazine noted. "Ubuntu Unity 22.04 LTS is a solid release with no obvious bad habits or issues identified. The return of the Unity Tweak Tool is a welcome addition to this release, as it works well, and this means Ubuntu Unity 22.04 LTS is better than its predecessor, 21.10. Ubuntu Unity continues to offer its users a lot of customization choices, plus a unique mix of default applications from the GNOME and MATE desktops".

Ubuntu Unity 22.10

Ubuntu Unity 22.10 is the first release as an official flavor and was released on 20 October 2022.

As the first release as an official Ubuntu flavour, Ubuntu Unity 22.10 was hosted on the Canonical's official service, cdimage.ubuntu.com. It also completed the move from libadwaita applications to MATE desktop alternatives. Unity packages were moved to hosting as Ubuntu "Universe" packages and the Ubuntu Unity desktop could also be installed on other Ubuntu flavours by simply adding the ubuntu-unity-desktop metapackage.

Applications
Some of the applications included by default in Ubuntu Unity are:

Cheese webcam application
CUPS printing system
Document Viewer (Evince) PDF viewer
Document Scanner (Simple Scan) optical scanner
Firefox web browser
Geary email client
GNOME Calendar desktop calendar
GNOME Disks disk manager
GNOME Files (Nautilus) file manager
GNOME Terminal terminal emulator
GNOME Videos (Totem) movie player
GParted partition editor
Image Viewer (Eye of GNOME) image viewer

LibreOffice office suite
Nemo file manager
PulseAudio audio controller
Remmina remote desktop client
Rhythmbox music player
Shotwell photo manager
Startup Disk Creator USB ISO writer
Text Editor (gedit) text editor
Thunderbird email client
Transmission bit torrent client
Ubuntu Software (GNOME Software) package management system
Unity Tweak Tool settings manager

Table of releases

See also

List of Linux distributions
Lubuntu
Xubuntu
Ubuntu Budgie
Ubuntu GNOME

References

External links

2020 software
GNOME
Linux distributions
Operating system distributions bootable from read-only media
Ubuntu derivatives